In the 1970s the American radio station WSAQ of Port Huron, Michigan partnered with Weatherline, Inc. to provide local weather forecast to the Greater Port Huron area by calling a local telephone number.  When the service was released in the 1970s the telephone number was (313) 987–8100, however, when the area code changed in 1993 to 810, the number was changed to (810) 987–8100.

Historically the free weather telephone service provided information about the sponsor and then the local forecast.  In 2015, WSAQ discontinued the service and the telephone number (810) 987-8100 was released back to AT&T to be reissued.

In 2016, Steven A Heisler, the founder of the Heisler Law Group, became aware the community lost the free telephone weather forecast service and requested AT&T to issue his firm the telephone number.  Once the telephone number was issued to the law firm, the firm purchased the telephone equipment from WeatherFone, LLC in Van Wert, Ohio to reinstate the service.  The new equipment reads the local temperature in Marysville, Michigan, and obtains the current time via a GPS unit that receives the time from the United States Atomic Clock in Boulder, Colorado.   The forecast is recorded several times a day by Tim Root, a meteorologist with Weather Watch Service in the state of Florida.

Because of the advanced capabilities of the new equipment, the firm also had assigned the old AT&T Time number from the 1960s, (313) 985–3121, now (810) 985-3121 because of the area code change in 1993; both numbers are connected to the new equipment and both provide the same information, date, time, current temperature, and forecast.

In 2016, the firm re-released the service as the new Blue Water Weather Telephone Service as a community service.  The firm sells no advertisement on the service and does not profit directly from providing the weather telephone service to the community.

References

Telephone services
Weather forecasting